Yang Mu (September 6, 1940 – March 13, 2020) was a pen name of Wang Ching-hsien(), a Taiwanese poet, essayist, critic, translator, and Professor Emeritus of Comparative Literature at the University of Washington, Seattle. He is considered one of the most accomplished poets writing in Chinese in the 20th and 21st century, known for his lyricism and linguistic ingenuity, modernising the Chinese diction and syntax while reviving a sublime style out of the idiom and imagery of Chinese and Western poetic traditions. His work was translated into Swedish by Swedish Academy member Göran Malmqvist. He was the first Taiwanese winner of Newman Prize for Chinese Literature (2013) and Cikada Prize (2016).

Biography 
Yang was born as Wang Ching-hsien on 6 September 1940 in Hualien County, Taiwan. When he was 16, only a high school student, he started off publishing his own works in several poetry magazines such as Blue Star, Modern Poetry and Genesis under the pen name Yeh Shan. Originally majoring in history at Tunghai University, he later found that it went against his genuine interest and finally transferred to the Department of Foreign Languages to pursue his literary ideals. At that time, he exposed himself to British romantic poetry and was influenced by some defining figures of the English Romantic Movement, like William Wordsworth, Lord Byron, Percy Bysshe Shelley, and John Keats.

After his graduation from Tunghai University, Yang chose to go to the United States for further study. In 1966, he obtained his Master of Fine Arts (English: Creative Writing) at the University of Iowa. While pursuing master's studies at Iowa, Yang wrote 15 letters to Keats. This practice ended after Yang left Iowa. Notably, a group of writers who later have become leading figures in the literary scene in contemporary Taiwan like Bai Xianyong, Yu Guangzhong, Ye Weilian and Wang Wenxing, were all his alumni at UI. And in 1971, he gained Ph.D of Comparative Literature at the University of California, Berkeley. His studying in America, obviously, contributed to the changes of his poetry style. Since 1972, he has written a series of works to convey his deep concern about the social reality under his new pen name Yang Mu. Changing from emphasizing sentimental and romantic feelings to intervening in social issues, the works in Yang's later period appear to be more calm, reserved and profound.

Yang used to teach at National Taiwan University (1975–76,1983–84), Princeton University (1978–79), and Hong Kong University of Science and Technology (1991–94); during 1996-2001 he was Professor of Chinese Literature and Founding Dean of the College of Humanities and Social Sciences at National Dong Hwa University in Hualien, Taiwan; and during 2002–06, the Distinguished Research Fellow and Director in the Institute of Chinese Literature and Philosophy at Academia Sinica in Taipei, Taiwan. He later became Professor Emeritus of Comparative Literature at the University of Washington and Chair Professor of Taiwanese Literature at National Chengchi University.

Yang was admitted to Cathay General Hospital in Taipei in March 2020, where he lapsed into a coma. He died on March 13, 2020, aged 79.

Major works 
As a prolific writer, Yang published 14 poetry collections, 15 prose collections and 1 verse play. His early works include On the Water Margin, Flower Season, Lantern Boat and Legends. These poetry collections were published under the pen name Ye Shan and were publicly thought to have created a new way of writing romantic poems.

Later, he was known to his readers as Yang Mu (楊牧) and published 12 other poetry collections such as Manuscripts Sealed in a Bottle, Songs of the Little Dipper, A Game of Taboos, The Coast with Seven Turns, Someone A Complete Fable, Ventures, Diaspsis Patelliformi, Songs long and short and so forth. Among them, Songs of the Little Dipper published in 1978, was prefaced by the famous Taiwanese novelist Wang Wenxing. In this preface, Wang spoke highly of its success in applying language and said that it took an important step towards achieving the new order of modern Chinese poetry.

Wu Feng: A Play in Four Acts, a verse play published in 1979, was another notable work. Through the narration of a story based on Taiwanese history, Yang expressed his praise for benevolence and human rationality. As a versatile writer, Yang's prose collections have also received much recognition. These works are mainly represented by Annual Ring, Storms over Hills and Ocean, The Completion of a Poem, The Midday Hawk and Then as I Went Leaving. They share some common themes, ranging from hometown memories to social criticism.

Yang's works have been translated into English, German, French, Japanese, Swedish Dutch, etc. No trace of the Gardener: Poems of Yang Mu (translated by Lawrence R. Smith & Michelle Yeh, New Haven: Ct. Yale University Press, 1998) and The Forbidden Game and Video Poems: The Poetry of Yang Mu and Lo Ch'ing (translated by Joseph R. Allen, Seattle: University of Washington Press, 1993) are two of his poetry collections available in English. He was the first poet and the first Taiwanese winning Newman Prize for Chinese Literature in the U.S. and the first Taiwanese awarded Cikada Prize in Sweden.

Yang was also a translator of Sir Gawain and the Green Knight, William Shakespeare's Tempest, W. B. Yeats's poetry, amongst others, into modern Chinese.

Legacy 
The Yang Mu Literature Lecture Series and Literary Award at National Dong Hwa University College of Humanities and Social Sciences are named after him.

He donated his personal library to create the Yang Mu Study at the National Dong Hwa University library.

Awards

See also 
 Xi Murong
 Hualing Nieh Engle

References

Further reading 

 No Trace of the Gardener: Poems of Yang Mu. Trans. Lawrence R. Smith and Michelle Yeh. London: Yale University Press, 1998. Print. 
 Wong, Lisa Laiming. Rays of the Searching Sun: The Transcultural Poetics of Yang Mu. New York: P. I. E. Peter Lang, 2009. Print.

External links

The Official Website of Yang Mu
 
Poems of Yang Mu, China Poetry Library
Yang Mu Website constructed by Research Center for Humanities and Social Sciences, National Chung-hsing University, Taiwan.

1940 births
2020 deaths
Academic staff of the National Dong Hwa University
People from Hualien County
Taiwanese expatriates in the United States
Taiwanese poets
Tunghai University alumni
UC Berkeley College of Letters and Science alumni
University of Iowa alumni
20th-century Taiwanese poets
21st-century Taiwanese poets
20th-century Taiwanese educators
21st-century Taiwanese educators
Taiwanese university and college faculty deans
Hualien City